Pittinger is a surname. Notable people with the surname include:

 Otto Pittinger (1878–1926), Bavarian medical officer, soldier and politician
 Togie Pittinger (1872–1909), American baseball player
 William Pittenger, misspelt as William Pittinger by many sources

See also
 Pittenger (surname)